The Turkish National Road Race Championship is a cycling race organized by the Turkish Cycling Federation. The winners of each event are awarded with a symbolic cycling jersey just like the national flag, these jerseys can be worn by the rider at other road racing events in the country to show their status as national champion. The champion's stripes can be combined into a sponsored rider's team kit design for this purpose. Mustafa Sayar and Azize Bekar are the current champions.

Multiple winners
Since 2005

Men

Men Junior

Women

Women Junior

Men
Source

Junior

Women
Source

Junior

See also
Turkish National Time Trial Championships
National Road Cycling Championships

References

National road cycling championships
Cycle races in Turkey
Cycling